Cloven Hoof, released in 1984, is the first full-length studio album by the British heavy metal band Cloven Hoof. The track "Gates Of Gehenna" from the band's debut E.P., The Opening Ritual, was re-recorded in this album. Neat Records re-released this album on CD in 2002 and included 3 bonus tracks that were recorded on 10 June 1983 for the BBC Friday Rock Show.

Track listing
All songs written by Lee Payne, unless indicated otherwise.

Side one
"Cloven Hoof" - 6:51
"Nightstalker" (Payne, Stephen Rounds) - 3:52 
"March of the Damned" - 1:49
"Gates of Gehenna" - 5:27

Side two
"Crack the Whip" - 4:36
"Laying Down the Law" (Payne, Rounds) - 4:33 
"Return of the Passover" (Payne, Kevin Poutney) - 9:01

2002 Edition bonus tracks
"Laying Down the Law" (Payne, Rounds) - 4:51 
"Crack the Whip" - 4:36
"Road of Eagles" - 6:08

Personnel
Cloven Hoof
David Potter - vocals
Steve Rounds - guitar
Lee Payne - bass
Kevin Poutney - drums

Production
Keith Nichol - producer, engineer

References

Cloven Hoof (band) albums
1984 albums